Paint Township is one of the ten townships of Fayette County, Ohio, United States. As of the 2010 census the population was 1,975, of whom 1,037 lived in the unincorporated portions of the township.

Geography
Located in the northern part of the county, it borders the following townships:
Range Township, Madison County - north
Madison Township - east
Marion Township - southeast
Union Township - south
Jefferson Township - west
Stokes Township, Madison County - northwest

Most of the village of Bloomingburg is located in southeastern Paint Township.

Name and history
Paint Township takes its name from the Paint Creek which flows through the township and enriches its soil. It is one of six Paint Townships statewide.

Government
The township is governed by a three-member board of trustees, who are elected in November of odd-numbered years to a four-year term beginning on the following January 1. Two are elected in the year after the presidential election and one is elected in the year before it. There is also an elected township fiscal officer, who serves a four-year term beginning on April 1 of the year after the election, which is held in November of the year before the presidential election. Vacancies in the fiscal officership or on the board of trustees are filled by the remaining trustees.

References

External links
County website

Townships in Fayette County, Ohio
Townships in Ohio